Third finger is an ambiguous term in English language due to two competing finger numbering systems used. It might refer to either the middle finger or the ring finger depending on the context.

It usually refers to the middle finger in a medical context, or in a musical context when referring to keyboard instruments, like piano.

It usually refers to the ring finger in common English, or in a musical context when referring to string instruments, like guitar, or wind instruments, like flute

See also
Fingers
First finger, second finger, third finger, fourth finger, fifth finger
Thumb, index finger, middle finger, ring finger, little finger
Fingering (music)
The finger, an obscene hand gesture

References

Fingers